Fun Mom Dinner  is a 2017 American comedy film directed by Alethea Jones, from a screenplay by Julie Rudd. It stars Katie Aselton, Toni Collette, Bridget Everett, Molly Shannon, Adam Scott, and Adam Levine.

The film had its world premiere at the Sundance Film Festival on January 27, 2017. It was released on August 4, 2017 by Momentum Pictures.

Plot
When four moms come together for a "fun mom dinner", the night takes an unexpected turn.

Cast
 Toni Collette as Kate
 Molly Shannon as Jamie
 Bridget Everett as Melanie
 Katie Aselton as Emily
 Adam Scott as Tom
 Rob Huebel as Andrew
 Adam Levine as Luke
 Paul Rust as Barry
 Sam Lerner as Alex
 Kathryn Prescott as Zoe
 Jaz Sinclair as Olivia
 Hart Denton as James
 Paul Rudd as Brady
 David Wain as Wayne
 John Early as Alfred
 Jessie Ennis as Francesca
 Jessica Chaffin as Jen
 Emmersyn Fiorentino as Grace
 Owen Vaccaro as Lucas
 Caleb and Matthew Paddock as Henry

Production
On June 22, 2016, it was reported that Alethea Jones would direct Fun Mom Dinner from a script by Julie Yaeger Rudd, featuring a cast including Toni Collette, Molly Shannon, Bridget Everett, and Adam Scott. Filming began that day in Los Angeles. Julian Wass composed the film's score.

Release
The film had its world premiere at the Sundance Film Festival on January 27, 2017. Prior to Sundance, Momentum Pictures and Netflix acquired U.S. distribution rights to the film. It was released in a limited release and through video on demand on August 4, 2017. It was released through Netflix on December 31, 2017.

Reception

Critical response
Fun Mom Dinner received generally negative reviews from critics. On review aggregator Rotten Tomatoes, the film holds a 33% approval rating, based on 27 reviews, with an average rating of 4.45/10. Metacritic gives the film a weighted average score of 46 out of 100, based on 12 critics, indicating "mixed or average reviews".

Reviewing the film for The New York Times, Nicole Herrington called it a "thin script" but praised the chemistry along the leads, and Everett's performance. Christy Lemire reviewing for Roger Ebert's website gave the film one-and-a-half stars on the basis that the film "makes the repeated mistake of banging us over the head with its running gags and needlessly spelling everything out, making the movie feel longer than its 81 minutes," and summarizing that "These are indeed moms, and they do have dinner, but the “fun” part is in short supply." The A.V. Club gave the film a "C" grade calling the film uninspired, and "undeniably disappointing when a movie called Fun Mom Dinner isn’t, well, much fun."

Accolades

References

External links
 

2017 films
2017 comedy films
American comedy films
Voltage Pictures films
Films shot in Los Angeles
2017 directorial debut films
2010s English-language films
2010s American films